Rocky Ford Junior Senior High School (formerly Rocky Ford High School) is the high school serving Rocky Ford, Colorado, United States.

References

External links 
 

Public high schools in Colorado
Schools in Otero County, Colorado
Public middle schools in Colorado